Alicia Cook is a poet, essayist and activist. She is best known for writing bestselling book Stuff I've Been Feeling Lately and for spreading awareness on the impact of drug addiction.

Education
Cook has a bachelor's degree in English Literature from Georgian Court University and an MBA from Saint Peter's University.

She was named Distinguished Alumni of the Year in 2020 by Georgian Court and was their commencement speaker in 2021.

Career
Cook's writing often explores grief, addiction, healing, and mental health. Her poetry is characterized by "direct, unflinching honesty and rich compassion."

In 2016, Cook released poetry collection Stuff I've Been Feeling Lately. The book tackled life, death, love, trauma and growth. It is split into two parts, part A contains original poems while part B were remixes of poems found in part A. The book was a finalist for Goodreads Choice Awards.

Cook is also known for intersecting music and poetry.

She was the main subject in A Family Disease, an episode of the documentary series Here's the Story on PBS. The episode focused on her advocacy and the ten year anniversary of the death of her cousin.

Cook released The Other Side of Addiction in 2017. It is a collection of essays about drug addiction. The book informs and comforts people who are affected by addiction, especially the families of who witnessed heir loved ones suffer in addiction.

In 2018, her second poetry book I Hope My Voice Doesn't Skip was released by Andrews McMeel Publishing.

In 2019, Cook went viral with the poem Sorry I haven't texted you back. She released a poetry book of the same name in October 2020. It was a semi-finalist in the Goodreads Choice Awards.

Cook's efforts to combat the opioid epidemic earned her recognitions. This includes a Women with Voices Award from the Women with Voices Foundation and a "special voices" award from NJPBS. She was also a "public health hero" finalist by NJBIZ.

Bibliography
Stuff I've Been Feeling Lately
Heroin Is the Worst Thing to Ever Happen to Me:  A Collection of Essays
I Hope My Voice Doesn't Skip
Sorry I Haven't Texted You Back

References

Year of birth missing (living people)
Living people
Place of birth missing (living people)
Nationality missing
American women poets
American women essayists
Georgian Court University alumni
Saint Peter's University alumni